Petra Klinge is a neurosurgeon and academic. She is professor of neurosurgery at Brown University.

Education and training
Klinge earned her medical degree from the University of Kiel in 1993. She conducted her neurosurgical residency at Hannover Medical School in Germany, completing it in 2002. The same year, she earned her habilitation and postdoctoral qualification "venia legendi".

Career
Klinge was senior associate professor of neurosurgery at the International Neuroscience Institute in Hannover, Germany until 2009, when she became attending neurosurgeon and associate professor at Brown University. She specializes in treating brain tumors, hydrocephalus and Alzheimer's disease, pediatric diseases, and congenital diseases like Chiari malformation and spinal malformations.

She is editor in chief of the medical journal Interdisciplinary Neurosurgery: Advanced Techniques and Case Management, a journal launched by Elsevier in 2013.

Selected publications

References

External links

 November 3, 2020
, February 4, 2021

20th-century births

Year of birth missing (living people)

Living people
University of Kiel alumni
Brown University faculty
American neurosurgeons
German neurosurgeons
German emigrants to the United States
21st-century American women physicians
21st-century American physicians